Gerson Hosea Malangalila Lwenge (born 20 February 1951) is a Tanzanian CCM politician and Member of Parliament for Njombe West constituency since 2010.

References

1951 births
Living people
Tanzanian engineers
Chama Cha Mapinduzi MPs
Tanzanian MPs 2010–2015
Tanzanian MPs 2015–2020
Tosamaganga Secondary School alumni
Mkwawa Secondary School alumni
Deputy government ministers of Tanzania
University of Dar es Salaam alumni